Dangers of Youth (Spanish: Peligros de juventud) is a 1960 Mexican drama film directed by Benito Alazraki and starring Elvira Quintana, Tere Velázquez and Fernando Luján.

Cast
 Elvira Quintana as Sue  
 Tere Velázquez as Catalina  
 Fernando Luján as Ricardo  
 Manuel 'Loco' Valdés as Charol  
 Roberto G. Rivera as Federico - Papá de Catalina  
 Aída Araceli as Elsa  
 Guillermina Téllez Girón as Alma  
 Xavier Loyá as Andrés  
 Héctor Godoy as Alfredo  
 Judy Ponte as Amiga de Matilde  
 Erika Rener as Matilde  
 José Luis Moreno 
 Emma Roldán as Lupe  
 Guillermina Mayaudón 
 Leopoldo Salazar 
 Ivan Richard Kraskin
 Mario Cid 
 Enedina Díaz de León as Vendedora de flores  
 Ignacio Peón as Profesor 
 Hernán Vera as Cliente

References

Bibliography 
 Emilio García Riera. Historia documental del cine mexicano: 1959-1960. Universidad de Guadalajara, 1994.

External links 
 

1960 films
1960 drama films
Mexican drama films
1960s Spanish-language films
Films directed by Benito Alazraki
1960s Mexican films